Jiowana Sauto (born March 13, 1998) is a Fijian rugby sevens player. She replaced Raijieli Daveau due to injury as a member of the Fijian women's national rugby sevens team for the 2016 Summer Olympics in Brazil.

Biography 
Sauto is from Vuna village located in Taveuni Island (the third biggest island in Fiji). Born and raised in Vuna, her love for the sport grew by watching her father and cousins play. She spent her high school years at Saint John's College in Cawaci, Ovalau Island. It was at Saint John's College that she was chosen to represent the Fiji Rugby Women Youth Team to the Commonwealth Games in Samoa in 2015. This started her journey to becoming a Fijiana in the same year.

Sauto featured in the 2015–16 World Rugby Women's Sevens Series. She played at the 2015 Dubai Women's Sevens. She was also included in the squad for the 2016 USA Women's Sevens. She was in the squad for the 2016 France Women's Sevens.

Sauto was named in the Fijiana Drua squad for the 2022 Super W season. She was named on the bench in the warm up match against Canada ahead of the World Cup. She was selected for the Fijiana squad to the 2021 Rugby World Cup in New Zealand.

References

External links

 

1998 births
Living people
Rugby sevens players at the 2016 Summer Olympics
Olympic rugby sevens players of Fiji
Fiji international rugby sevens players
Fijian female rugby union players
Fiji international women's rugby sevens players
Fiji women's international rugby union players